The Fall of the Earl of Essex is a 1731 tragedy by the writer James Ralph. It was inspired by Restoration-era drama The Unhappy Favourite by John Banks about the downfall of the Earl of Essex, a military commander and former favourite of Elizabeth I.

It was performed at the Goodman's Fields Theatre in Whitechapel, then attempting to challenge the two patent theatres of London. The original cast included Henry Giffard as Essex, James Rosco as Southampton, William Giffard as Burleigh, Anna Marcella Giffard as Lady Essex and Henrietta Morgan as Lady Nottingham.

References

Bibliography
 Burling, William J. A Checklist of New Plays and Entertainments on the London Stage, 1700-1737. Fairleigh Dickinson Univ Press, 1992.
 Nicoll, Allardyce. A History of Early Eighteenth Century Drama: 1700-1750. CUP Archive, 1927.

1731 plays
Tragedy plays
Plays by James Ralph
Plays based on real people
Plays set in London
Plays set in the 16th century
Cultural depictions of noblemen
Cultural depictions of Elizabeth I
Plays based on actual events